Vigorous Development in National Activity was a Neo-Nazi and Pan-Turkist political party formed in İzmir, Turkey in 1969 by a group of former Republican Villagers Nation Party (CKMP) members. The club maintained two combat units. The members wore SA uniforms and used the Hitler salute. One of the leaders, Gündüz Kapancıoğlu, was re-admitted to the Nationalist Movement Party (MHP) in 1975. A few days later, the party merged with the MHP and abolished itself. The Party was relatively small, with an estimated 20 members at its peak in 1969.

References 

Neo-Nazi political parties
Neo-Nazism in Asia
Defunct political parties in Turkey
Anti-communism in Turkey
Organizations based in İzmir
1969 establishments in Turkey
1975 disestablishments in Turkey